Qasr Hur is a village in the governorate of Minya, Egypt, around 300 km south of Cairo, on the edge of the Western Desert. The village is predominantly Muslim with a small Christian minority. The Coptic Orthodox priest of Qasr Hur  Father Matias Kamal has been tending the ruined church of the Monastery of Abu Fanah now, and since the mid eighties of the 20th The Coptic Orthodox priest of used to be responsible for the Monastery.

Official Website : https://www.qasrhur.com

Villages in Egypt
Western Desert (Egypt)
Populated places in Minya Governorate